Penrod and His Twin Brother is a 1938 American comedy film directed by William C. McGann and written by William Jacobs and Hugh Cummings. The film stars Billy Mauch, Bobby Mauch, Frank Craven, Spring Byington, Charles Halton and Claudia Coleman. The film was released by Warner Bros. on February 26, 1938.

Plot

Cast 
 Billy Mauch as Penrod
 Bobby Mauch as Danny 
 Frank Craven as Mr. Schofield
 Spring Byington as Mrs. Schofield
 Charles Halton as Mr. Bitts
 Claudia Coleman as Mrs. Bitts
 Jackie Morrow as Rodney Bitts
 Philip Hurlic as Vermin
 Benny Bartlett as Chuck 
 Bernice Pilot as Delia
 Johnnie Pirrone Jr. as Sam 
 Billy Lechner as Donald
 Charley Foy as Kraemer
 Charles Jordan as Shorty
 Jay Adler as Johnson
 Max Wagner as Blackie
 Eddie Collins as Captain
 Fred Lawrence as Clark
 Robert Homans as Chief Flynn

References

External links 
 
 
 
 

1938 films
Warner Bros. films
American comedy films
1938 comedy films
Films directed by William C. McGann
American black-and-white films
Films based on works by Booth Tarkington
1930s English-language films
1930s American films